Inspector Singh Investigates is a series of crime fiction novels, written by Malaysian author, Shamini Flint.

There are currently seven books in the series. The first book in the series was printed in 2009 and has since been printed in numerous languages around the world.  The most recent book in the series, book No.7, Inspector Singh Investigates: A Frightfully English Execution, has been released in May 2016.

Main character
They tell the story of Inspector Singh, a fat Sikh, Singaporean murder investigator, with a track record in catching killers.  He does not fit into the Singapore police force culture, so he gets sent by his superiors on investigations anywhere but Singapore.  The aim is to keep him as far from Singapore as possible and hopefully to keep him away from trouble, which is always near by when Inspector Singh is involved.

Inspector Singh Investigates: A Most Peculiar Malaysian Murder: ‘It’s impossible to not warm to this sweating, dishevelled, wheezing Inspector Singh from the start of this delightful novel… Flint’s thoughtful and compassionate exploration of racial and religious tensions between the two countries is thoroughly compelling’ The Guardian, UK.

Storyline 
Inspector Singh is in a bad mood. He's been sent from his home in Singapore to Kuala Lumpur to solve a murder that has him stumped. Chelsea Liew – the famous Singaporean model – is on death row for the murder of her ex-husband. She swears she didn't do it, he thinks she didn't do it, but no matter how hard he tries to get to the bottom of things, he still arrives back at the same place – that Chelsea's husband was shot at point blank range, and that Chelsea had the best motivation to pull the trigger: he was taking her kids away from her. Now Inspector Singh must pull out all the stops to crack a crime that could potentially free a beautiful and innocent woman and reunite a mother with her children. There's just one problem – the Malaysian police refuse to play ball...

Published novels 
Inspector Singh Investigates: A Most Peculiar Malaysian Murder (April 2009, Piatkus Press; 2011, Felony & Mayhem Press)  
Inspector Singh Investigates: A Bali Conspiracy Most Foul (September 2009, Piatkus Press) 
Inspector Singh Investigates: The Singapore School of Villainy (April 2010, Piatkus Press) 
Inspector Singh Investigates: A Deadly Cambodian Crime Spree (April 2011, Piatkus Press) 
Inspector Singh Investigates: A Curious Indian Cadaver (April 5, 2012, Piatkus Press) 
Inspector Singh Investigates: A Calamitous Chinese Killing (September 2013, Piatkus Press) 
Inspector Singh Investigates: A Frightfully English Execution (May 2016, Piatkus Press)

Television adaptation 
Sanjeev Bhaskar will star in a three-part television adaptation of the books for BritBox International. The series will be shot in Malaysia.

References

Detective novels
Crime novel series
Mystery novels by series
Fictional police detectives
Fictional Singaporean people